The Strategic Rocket Forces of the Russian Federation or the Strategic Missile Forces of the Russian Federation (RVSN RF; , lit. 'Strategic Purpose Rocketry Troops') is a separate-troops branch of the Russian Armed Forces that controls Russia's land-based intercontinental ballistic missiles (ICBMs).

The Strategic Rocket Forces was created on 17 December 1959 as part of the Soviet Armed Forces as the main force intended for attacking an enemy's offensive nuclear weapons, military facilities, and industrial infrastructure.
They operated all Soviet nuclear ground-based intercontinental, intermediate-range ballistic missile, and medium-range ballistic missile with ranges over 1,000 kilometers. After the Soviet Union collapsed in 1991, assets of the Strategic Rocket Forces were in the territories of several new states in addition to Russia, with armed nuclear missile silos in Belarus, Kazakhstan and Ukraine. The three of them transferred their missiles to Russia for destruction and they all joined the Nuclear Non-Proliferation Treaty.

Complementary strategic forces within Russia include the Russian Aerospace Forces' Long Range Aviation and the Russian Navy's ballistic missile submarines. Together the three bodies form Russia's nuclear triad.

History 

The first Soviet rocket study unit was established in June 1946, by redesignating the 92nd Guards Mortar Regiment at Bad Berka in East Germany as the 22nd Brigade for Special Use of the Reserve of the Supreme High Command. On October 18, 1947, the brigade conducted the first launch of the remanufactured former German A-4  ballistic missile, or R-1, from the Kapustin Yar Range. In the early 1950s the 77th and 90th Brigades were formed to operate the R-1 (SS-1a 'Scunner'). The 54th and 56th Brigades were formed to conduct test launches of the R-2 (SS-2 'Sibling') at Kapustin Yar on June 1, 1952.

From 1959 the Soviets introduced a number of intercontinental ballistic missiles (ICBMs) into service, including the R-12 (SS-4 'Sandal'), the R-7 (SS-6 'Sapwood'), the R-16 (SS-7 'Saddler'), the R-9 (SS-8 'Sasin'), the R-26 (given the NATO reporting name SS-8 'Sasin' due to incorrect identification as the R-9), the R-36 (SS-9 'Scarp'), and the RT-21 (SS-16 'Sinner'), which was possibly never made fully operational.

By 1990 all these early types of missiles had been retired from service. In 1990 the Strategic Missile Forces were officially established as a service branch of the Armed Forces under the direct control of the Defense Ministry. The date of its formal foundation, December 17, is celebrated as Strategic Missile Forces Day.

Two rocket armies were formed in 1960. The 43rd Rocket Army and the 50th Rocket Army were formed from the previous 43rd and 50th Air Armies of the Long Range Aviation.

During a test of the R-16 ICBM on October 24, 1960, the test missile exploded on the pad, killing the first commander of the SRF, Chief Marshal of Artillery Mitrofan Ivanovich Nedelin. This disaster, the details of which were concealed for decades, became known as the Nedelin catastrophe. He was succeeded by Marshal of the Soviet Union Kirill Moskalenko who was in turn quickly succeeded by Marshal Sergey Biryuzov. Under Marshal Вiryuzov the SRF deployed missiles to Cuba in 1962 as part of Operation Anadyr. 36 R-12 intermediate range ballistic missiles were sent to Cuba, initiating the Cuban Missile Crisis. The 43rd Guards Missile Division of 43rd Rocket Army manned the missiles while in Cuba.

Marshal Nikolai Krylov took over in March 1963 and served until February 1972. During this time French President Charles de Gaulle visited the Strategic Missile Forces in 1966. Together with NI Krylov, he visited a missile division in Novosibirsk, and then at the invitation of Leonid Brezhnev participated in a demonstration missile launch at the Baikonur Cosmodrome in the Kazakh SSR. Chief Marshal of Artillery Vladimir Fedorovich Tolubko commanded the SRF from April 12, 1972, to July 10, 1985. Tolubko emphasised raising the physical fitness standards within the SRF. He was succeeded by General of the Army Yury Pavlovich Maksimov, who was in command from July 10, 1985, to August 19, 1992.

According to a 1980 TIME Magazine article citing analysts from RAND Corporation, Soviet non-Slavs were generally barred from joining the Strategic Missile Forces because of suspicions about the loyalty of ethnic minorities to the Kremlin.

In 1989 the Strategic Missile Forces had over 1,400 ICBMs, 300 launch control centers, and twenty-eight missile bases. The SMT operated RSD-10 (SS-20 'Saber') intermediate-range ballistic missiles (IRBMs) and R-12 (SS-4 'Sandal') medium-range ballistic missiles (MRBMs). Two-thirds of the road-mobile Soviet RSD-10 force was based in the western Soviet Union and was aimed at Western Europe.

One-third of the force was located east of the Ural Mountains and was targeted primarily against China. Older R-12 missiles were deployed at fixed sites in the western Soviet Union. The Intermediate-Range Nuclear Forces Treaty, signed in December 1987, called for the elimination of all 553 Soviet RSD-10 and R-12 missiles within three years. As of mid-1989, over 50% of RSD-10 and R-12 missiles had been eliminated.

By 1990 the Soviet Union had seven types of operational ICBMs. About 50% were heavy R-36M (SS-18 'Satan') and UR-100N (SS-19 'Stiletto') ICBMs, which carried 80% of the country's land-based ICBM warheads. By this time it was producing new mobile, and hence survivable ICBMs, the RT-23 (SS-24 'Scalpel') and RT-2PM (SS-25 'Sickle').

In 1990, with the R-12 apparently fully retired, the IISS reported that there were 350 UR-100s (SS-11 'Sego,' Mod 2/3), 60 RT-2s (SS-13 'Savage') still in service in one missile field, 75 UR-100MRs (SS-17 'Spanker,' Mod 3, with 4 MIRV), 308 R-36Ms (mostly Mod 4 with 10 MIRV), 320 UR-100Ns (mostly Mod 3 with 6 MIRV), some 60 RT-23s (silo and rail-mobile), and some 225 RT-2PMs (mobile).

Composition of the Strategic Missile Forces 1960–1991

RSVN training establishments included:
the Order of Lenin Military Academy named for F.E. Dzerzhinskiy in Moscow;
the Military Engineering Red Banner Institute imeni A.F. Mozhayskiy (VIKI) in Leningrad; 
the Kharkov Higher Military Command Engineering School Missile Forces imeni Marshal of the Soviet Union N.I. Krylov
the Krasnodar Higher Military Command Engineering School Missile Forces (KVVKIU) (1982-1998)
the Perm Higher Military Command Engineering Red Banner School Missile Forces (:ru:Пермский военный институт ракетных войск)
the Riga Higher Military Political Red Banner School imeni Marshal of the Soviet Union S.S. Biryuzov (under the SRF from 1959-1993)
the Rostov Higher Military Command Engineering School Missile Forces (RVVKIU) (1959 onwards)
the Saratov Higher Military Command Engineering Red Banner order of the Red Star School Missile Forces imeni Major-General A.I. Lizyukov (SVVKIU) (1959-2003)
the Serpukhov Higher Military Command Engineering School Missile Forces imeni Leninskiy Komsomol (SVVKU)

Post Soviet Union 
Like most of the Russian Armed Forces, the Strategic Missile Forces had limited access to resources for new equipment in the Yeltsin era. However, the Russian government made a priority of ensuring that the Missile Forces received new missiles to phase out older, less-reliable systems, and to incorporate newer capabilities in the face of international threats to the viability of the nuclear deterrent effect provided by their missiles. In particular the development of missile defense systems in the United States.

In 1995, the "Strategic Missile Forces Day" and "Military Space Forces Day" were created. On July 16, 1997, President Boris Yeltsin signed a decree incorporating  the Russian Space Forces and the Space Missile Defence Forces (Russian: Ракетно-космической обороны) into the SMT. In doing so, 'nearly 60' military units and establishments were dissolved. However, four years later, on June 1, 2001, the Russian Space Forces were reformed as a separate branch of service from the SMT.

Minister of Defence Marshal of the Russian Federation Igor Sergeev, a former commander of the SMT from August 19, 1992 – May 22, 1997, played a major role in assuring funding for his former service. He was succeeded by General of the Army Vladimir Yakovlev, who commanded the SMT from June 1997 until April 27, 2001. Yakovlev was succeeded by Colonel General Nikolay Solovtsov.

Solovtsov was dismissed in July–August 2009. Speculation over why Solovtsov was dismissed included opposition to further cuts in deployed nuclear ballistic missile warheads below the April 2009 figure of 1,500, the fact that he had reached the retirement age of 60, despite that he had recently been extended another year's service, or the failure of the Navy's Bulava missile).

After only a year, Lieutenant General Andrey Shvaichenko, appointed on August 3, 2009, by President Dmitry Medvedev, was replaced. The current commander of the Strategic Missile Forces, Colonel General Sergei Karakayev, was appointed to the post by a presidential decree of June 22, 2010.

The RVSN headquarters has a special sledgehammer that can be used to gain access to the launch codes if the commander feels the need to use it or if ordered directly, but doesn't have normal access to the safe. In 2020, the Strategic Missile Forces completed switching to digital information transmission technology.

Composition since 2010s

The main RVSN command post is at Kuntsevo in the suburbs of Moscow. The alternate command post is at Kosvinsky Mountain in the Urals.

Female cadets have started to join the Peter the Great Strategic Missile Forces Academy. RVSN institutes also exist at Serpukhov and Rostov-on-Don. An ICBM test impact range is located in the Far East, the Kura Test Range. This has been under Aerospace Defence Forces' command since 2010. 

The Strategic Missile Forces operate four distinct missile systems. The oldest system is the silo-based R-36M2 / SS-18 Satan. It carries ten warheads. The last missile will be in service until 2020.

The second system is the silo-based UR-100NUTTH / SS-19 Stiletto. The last Stiletto missiles in service with six warheads each will be removed by 2019. The third system, the single warhead mobile RT-2PM Topol / SS-25 Sickle are planned to be decommissioned by 2019.

A new missile entering service is the RT-2UTTH Topol-M / SS-27 Sickle B with single warhead, of which 60 are silo-based and 18 are mobile. Some new missiles will be added in the future. The first upgraded Topol-M called RS-24 Yars, carrying three warheads, was commissioned in 2010. In July 2011 the first mobile regiment with nine missiles was completed. From 2012 to 2017, about 80 ICBMs were placed in active duty. The RF Defense Minister said in December 2022 that 91.3% of the country's nuclear forces was modern.

Units 
The composition of missiles and warheads of the Strategic Missile Forces previously had to be revealed as part of the START I treaty data exchange. The most recently reported (January 2020) order of battle of the forces is as follows:

 27th Guards Rocket Army (HQ: Vladimir)
 98th Mixed Aviation Squadron
 7th Guards Rocket Division at Vypolzovo with 18+ mobile RS-24 Yars
 14th Rocket Division at Yoshkar-Ola with 27 mobile RS-24 Yars
 28th Guards Rocket Division at Kozelsk with 17 (December 2022) silo-based RS-24
 54th Guards Rocket Division at Teykovo with 18 mobile RT-2UTTH Topol-M and 18 (December 2011) mobile RS-24
 60th Rocket Division at Tatischevo with 30 silo-based UR-100NUTTH and 60 silo-based RT-2UTTH Topol-M
 31st Rocket Army (HQ: Orenburg)
 102nd Mixed Aviation Squadron
 8th Rocket Division at Pervomaysky, Kirov Oblast
 13th Red Banner Rocket Division at Dombarovskiy with 18 silo-based R-36M2 and 8 (December 2022) UR-100NUTTH with Avangard (hypersonic glide vehicle)s (Project 4202). The R-36s will be replaced with the new RS-28 Sarmat when operational.
 42nd Rocket Division at Nizhniy Tagil with 27 mobile RS-24 Yars
 33rd Guards Rocket Army (HQ: Omsk)
 105th Mixed Aviation Squadron
 29th Guards Rocket Division at Irkutsk with 27 mobile RS-24 Yars
 35th Rocket Division at Barnaul with mobile RT-2PM Topol and RS-24 Yars
 39th Guards Rocket Division at Novosibirsk with 27 mobile RS-24 Yars
 62nd Rocket Division at Uzhur with 28 silo-based R-36M2, which will also replaced with the new RS-28 Sarmat when operational.

Numbers of missiles and warheads

The Strategic Missile Forces have:

 46 silo-based R-36M2 (SS-18) with up to 10 warheads, to be retired 2022
 45 mobile RT-2PM "Topol" (SS-25)  with 1 warhead, flagged for future retirement
 60 silo-based RT-2UTTH "Topol M" (SS-27) with 1 warhead
 18 mobile RT-2UTTH "Topol M" (SS-27) with 1 warhead 
 17 silo-based RS-24 "Yars" (SS-29) with up to 4 warheads
 135+ mobile RS-24 "Yars" (SS-29) with up to 4 warheads

Kristensen and Korda (2020) list the UR-100N (SS-19), as retired from deployment, while noting that UR-100NUTTH being deployed with the Avangard.

Obsolete weapons and equipment

Medium-range ballistic missiles 
 R-12 Dvina, SS-4 Sandel – In service from 1959 to 1993.

Intermediate-range ballistic missiles 
  R-14 Chusovaya, SS-5 Skean – In service from 1962 to 1984.
 RSD-10 Pioneer, SS-20 Sabre, SS-23 Sabre 2 – In service from 1976 to 1988.

Intercontinental-range ballistic missiles 
 MR-UR-100 Sotka, SS-17 Spanker – In service from 1975 to 1995.
  R-7 Semyorka, SS-6 Sapwood – In service from 1959 to 1968.
 R-9 Desna, SS-8 Sasin – In service from 1964 to 1976.
 R-16, SS-7 Saddler – In service from 1961 to 1976.
 RT-2, SS-13 Savage – In service from 1968 to 1976.
 RT-20P, SS-15 Scrooge – In service from 1961 to 1962.
 RT-21 Temp 2S, SS-16 Sinner – In service from 1976 to 1986.
 RT-23 Molodets, SS-24 Scalpel – In service from 1987 to 2005.
 UR-100, SS-11 Sego – In service from 1967 to 1974.
 UR-200, SS-10 Scrag – In service from 1963 to 1964.

Ranks and rank insignia 
Officer ranks

Other ranks

Future
According to the Federation of American Scientists, for the foreseeable future, all new Russian ICBM deployments will be of MIRVed versions of the SS-27 "Topol-M". A “new ICBM” and a “heavy ICBM” are also being developed. By the early 2020s, according to announcements by Russian military officials, all SS-18 and SS-25 ICBMs will be retired from service following the retirements of the SS-19 systems.

This development would leave a Russian ICBM force structure based on five modifications of the solid-fuel SS-27 (silo- and mobile-based SS-27 Mod 1 (Topol-M); silo- and mobile-based SS-27 Mod 2 (RS-24 Yars); and the RS-26 Rubezh) and the liquid-fuel RS-28 Sarmat with a large payload – either MIRV or some advanced payload to evade missile defense systems. Although the future force will be smaller, a greater portion of it will be MIRVed – up from approximately 36 percent in 2014 to roughly 70 percent by 2024.

See also

Dead Hand
Russian Aerospace Defence Forces
Awards and emblems of the Ministry of Defence of the Russian Federation
List of states with nuclear weapons

References

Further reading
Дороговоз И. Г. Ракетные войска СССР. — Минск: Харвест, 2007. — 336 с. — 
John G. Hines et al. Soviet Intentions 1965–1985. Braddock Dunn & McDonald (BDM), 1995.
  Strategic Missile Forces museum 
 
"Владимирская Ракетная Стратегическая" (Vladimirskaya Strategic Missile) by I.V. Vershkov and V.G. Gagarin; Vladimir 2006; 480 pages;
"Оренбургская Стратегическая" (Orenburg Strategic) by Y.N. Feoktistov; Perm 2001; 328 pages; (also a 1997 edition).
"Читинская Ракетная Армия" (Chitinskaya Missile Army) by ??; Chita, 2002; 268 pages
"История 50-й Ракетной Армии I-IV" (History 50th Missile Army, part 1–4) by G.I. Smirnov and A.I. Yasakov; Smolensk 2008; 370+342+387+561 pages
"Стратеги" (Strategic) by V.T. Nosov; Moscow, 2008; 276 pages;

External links 

 Official Page
 CSIS Missile Threat - Russia
 Strategic Missile Forces museum Official Website 
 Russian Nuclear Notebook 2019 - forces and Rocket Divisions

Strategic Rocket Forces
Strategic forces